The Muslim Brotherhood in Iraq is an Iraqi branch of the Sunni Islamist Muslim Brotherhood organization. The group was founded in 1940, and became legal in 1949 under the name of the Islamic Brotherhood Association.

References

Muslim Brotherhood
Jihadist groups in Iraq
Islamism in Iraq